Umm Salama bint Yaʿqūb al-Makhzūmī was the principal wife  of first Abbasid caliph al-Saffah, the founder of Abbasid dynasty. Umm Salama  was the only woman in the Caliphate's history who had relation through marriage with both Caliphal dynasties; Umayyads and Abbasids.

Ancestry
Umm Salama bint Ya'qub ibn Salama ibn Abd Allah ibn al-Walid, was a member of the aristocratic Banu Makhzum clan of the Quraysh tribe and a fourth-generation descendant of al-Walid ibn al-Walid (the brother of Khalid ibn al-Walid). Her father was Ya'qub ibn Salama, the brother of Ayyub ibn Salama. Her father and uncle were prominent members of the Makhzum.

Biography
Umm Salama spent her early life in Mecca and Medina. She married the Umayyad prince Abd al-Aziz, a son of Caliph al-Walid I, but he died in 728 or 729. She afterward married the Umayyad prince Maslama, a son of Caliph Hisham, and he died in the 740s. She had her son Sa'id from Maslama. Sa'id became an oral transmitter of historical tradition in the early Abbasid period.

After Maslama's death, Umm Salama married the first Abbasid caliph al-Saffah. Al-Saffah married her before becoming the caliph. He admired her considerably and did not have other wives as was the usual case among the caliphs. He consulted with her until he assumed the caliphate. With al-Saffah, she had a son, Muhammad, and a daughter, Rayta. In 761, Caliph al-Mahdi married Rayta as his first wife after his return from Khurasan. Thus, she was also the mother-in-law of al-Mahdi.

After al-Saffah's death in 754, she probably married another Abbasid member.

Family
Ya'qub ibn Salama's daughter Umm Salama, he had familial ties with Caliph Hisham's son Maslama and the first Abbasid caliph, al-Saffah, both of whom were married at one point to Umm Salama and had children from her. Their daughter Rayta married the third Abbasid caliph al-Mahdi and gave birth to his sons Ubaydallah and Ali.

See also
 Arwa bint Mansur al-Himyari

References

Sources

 

8th-century births
8th-century deaths
Women from the Umayyad Caliphate
8th-century women from the Abbasid Caliphate
Wives of Abbasid caliphs
8th-century people from the Abbasid Caliphate
Arab princesses
8th-century Arabs
Banu Makhzum